Belle Époque is a 1992 comedy-drama film directed by Fernando Trueba. Consisting of a fable-like story, primarily displaying a warm tone, and set in an idyllic countryside location during the transition to the Second Spanish Republic, the film features Jorge Sanz, Maribel Verdú, Ariadna Gil, Penélope Cruz, Miriam Díaz Aroca, Fernando Fernán Gómez, Gabino Diego and Chus Lampreave, among others.

It received the Goya Award for Best Film along with eight other Goya Awards and was named Best Foreign Language Film at the 66th Academy Awards. It is a joint production among companies from Spain, Portugal and France.

Plot
In February 1931, some weeks after the failed Jaca uprising and the likewise failed , Spain is on the verge of the proclamation of the Second Republic. Fernando, a deserting private with Republican leanings and former seminarist, is on the run from his assignment at the Cuatro Vientos base. After escaping from two Guardia Civil officers, he reaches the outskirts of a village, befriending Manolo, an old man with a semblance of a "Dickensian observer of life". Manolo owns a large house in the countryside, where Fernando stays for a while. Upon the arrival of Manolo's four daughters in a train, Fernando is enchanted by them all. As he meets each of the first three one by one, he falls in love and has sex with each of them, determining to marry. With each one, however, a complication arises: Clara, a widow who only recently lost her husband and who seeks solace with Fernando; Violeta, a lesbian who is attracted to Fernando only when he is dressed as a woman for a costume ball and Rocío, a social climber who is about to marry to Juanito into the village's richest family (with Carlist leanings) for the security it would provide and who only momentarily succumbs to Fernando's charms. Heartbroken each time, the father of the girls encourages Fernando to have patience. Each of the daughters is beautiful and represents a different aspect of feminine sexuality. The youngest of the family, Luz, represents naïveté. While Fernando is pursuing her sisters, Luz gets progressively angry and jealous. Eventually Fernando realizes, however, that Luz is the best one of the four to marry.

Cast

Production 
A Spanish-Portuguese-French co-production, Belle Époque was produced by Fernando Trueba PC, Lola Films, Animatógrafo and French Production with collaboration of Sogepaq and Eurimages. The film was shot in the summer of 1992 in several villages of Portugal.

Release 
The film was theatrically released in Spain on 4 December 1992.

Critical reception
Belle Époque received positive reviews getting a 93% on Rotten Tomatoes. The film is mentioned in the 2010 American film The Fighter.

Year-end lists 
 Top 10 (listed alphabetically, not ranked) – Mike Mayo, The Roanoke Times
 Honorable mentions – Mike Clark, USA Today

Box office
In Spain it was the highest-grossing Spanish film of 1992 with a gross of over 725 million Spanish pesetas ($5.58 million). In the United States and Canada it grossed $6 million for a worldwide gross in excess of $11 million.

Accolades 

|-
| align = "center" rowspan = "18" | 1993 || 43rd Berlin International Film Festival || colspan = "2" | Golden Bear ||  || 
|-
| rowspan = "17" | 7th Goya Awards || colspan = "2" | Best Film ||  || rowspan = "17" | 
|-
| Best Director || Fernanro Trueba || 
|-
| Best Original Screenplay || Fernando Trueba José Luis García Sánchez, Rafael Azcona || 
|-
| Best Actress || Ariadna Gil || 
|-
| Best Actor || Jorge Sanz || 
|-
| rowspan = "2" | Best Supporting Actress || Chus Lampreave || 
|-
| Mary Carmen Ramírez || 
|-
| rowspan = "2" | Best Supporting Actor || Fernando Fernán-Gómez || 
|-
| Gabino Diego || 
|-
| Best Cinematography || José Luis Alcaine || 
|-
| Best Editing || Carmen Frías || 
|-
| Best Art Direction || Juan Botella || 
|-
| Best Production Supervision || Cristina Huete || 
|-
| Best Costume Design || Lala Huete || 
|-
| Best Makeup and Hairstyles || Ana Ferreira, Ana Lorena || 
|-
| Best Original Score || Antoine Duhamel || 
|-
| Best Sound || Alfonso Pino, Georges Prat || 
|-
| align = "center" | 1994 || 66th Academy Awards || colspan = "2" | Best Foreign Language Film ||  
|-
| align = "center" | 1995 || 48th British Academy Film Awards || colspan = "2" | BAFTA Award for Best Film Not in the English Language ||  || 
|}

See also
 List of Spanish films of 1992
 List of submissions to the 66th Academy Awards for Best Foreign Language Film
 List of Spanish submissions for the Academy Award for Best Foreign Language Film

Notes

References

External links
 
 
 

1992 films
1992 comedy-drama films
Best Film Goya Award winners
Best Foreign Language Film Academy Award winners
Films directed by Fernando Trueba
Films featuring a Best Actress Goya Award-winning performance
Films featuring a Best Supporting Actor Goya Award-winning performance
Films featuring a Best Supporting Actress Goya Award-winning performance
Films set in Spain
Films set in 1931
Spanish comedy-drama films
1990s Spanish-language films
Films produced by Fernando Trueba
Films with screenplays by Rafael Azcona
Films shot in Portugal
LolaFilms films
1990s Spanish films